Alexander McCallum may refer to:
 Alick McCallum (1877–1937), Western Australian politician
 Alexander McCallum (minister) (1866–1935), president-general of the Methodist Church of Australasia 1920–1923
 Alexander McCallum (swimmer), swimmer from the Cayman Islands, won silver and bronze Swimming at the 2015 Island Games